Pterulina is a genus of stick insects in the tribe Clitumnini, erected by Bresseel & Constant in 2020.  To date, species have been recorded from Vietnam only.

Species
The Phasmida Species File lists:
 Pterulina distinctissima (Redtenbacher, 1908) - type species (as Sipyloidea distinctissima Redtenbacher; locality southern Vietnam)
 Pterulina simoensi Bresseel & Constant, 2020

References

External links

Phasmatodea genera
Phasmatodea of Asia
Phasmatidae